Kandukuru is a village in the Vemsoor mandal of Khammam district, Telangana, India. It comes under Sathupally assembly and Khammam Lokh Sabha constituencies.

In the 2001 census, the village had a population of 5,212.

References

Villages in Khammam district